was a professional Japanese baseball player.

External links

1971 births
Living people
Baseball people from Ibaraki Prefecture
Japanese expatriate baseball players in the United States
Asian Games medalists in baseball
Baseball players at the 1994 Asian Games
Asian Games gold medalists for Japan
Medalists at the 1994 Asian Games
Nippon Professional Baseball infielders
Waseda University alumni
Yomiuri Giants players
Yokohama BayStars players
Nippon Professional Baseball Rookie of the Year Award winners
Lancaster Barnstormers players